Driffield is a village and civil parish in the Cotswold district of Gloucestershire, England. The parish includes the village of Harnhill. In 2021 the parish had a population of 173.

History 
The name "Driffield" means 'Dirty open land' or possibly, 'stubbly open land'. Driffield was recorded in the Domesday Book as Drifelle. On 1 April 1935 the parish of Harnhill was abolished and merged with Driffield.

References

External links 
 ukga.org

Villages in Gloucestershire
Civil parishes in Gloucestershire
Cotswold District